Vanel is a surname. Notable people with the surname include:

Charles Vanel (1892–1989), French actor and director
Clyde Vanel, American politician and member of the New York Assembly from the 33rd District
Gabriel Vanel (1925–2013), Roman Catholic archbishop of the Archdiocese of Auch, France